The Dabuyid or Gaubarid Dynasty was a Zoroastrian Iranian dynasty that started in the first half of the seventh century as an independent group of rulers, reigning over Tabaristan and parts of western Khorasan. Dabuyid rule over Tabaristan and Khorasan lasted from ca. AD 642 to the Abbasid conquest in 760.

History 
The family's early history is recorded by the later historian Ibn Isfandiyar. According to this tradition, the Dabuyids were descended from Jamasp, a son of Sassanid King of Kings Peroz I and younger brother of Kavadh I, and were therefore a cadet branch of the House of Sasan. Jamasp's grandson, Piruz, conquered Gilan, and a progeny of Piruz's, Gil, nicknamed Gavbara (literally Devotee of the Cow), then extended the family's rule by annexing Tabaristan. This led to the formal conferment of the titles of Gil e Gilan ("ruler of Gilan") and Padashwargarshah ("King of Patashwargar", the older name of Tabaristan's mountains), to Gil's son Dabuya or Daboe, by the last Sassanid King of Kings, Yazdegerd III. Following the Muslim conquest of Persia, this Sassanian cadet branch, along with the dynasts of the noble houses of Ispahbudan and Karin, signed peace treaties with the Arab armies by which the Arabs were obligated to never approach these territories without prior permission. Consequently the regions of Gilan and at least parts of Tabaristan remained under Gavbara's control, while Rey and parts of Khorasan were ruled by Farrokhzad of House of Ispahbudan. After about 15 years, Ibn Isfandiyar reports that Gavbara died and his son Dabuya succeeded the throne - hence the name given to the dynasty. Dabuya's son, Farrukhan the Great was successful in taking over Tabaristan up to the frontiers of Nishapur after years of dynastic struggle between the houses of Karin and Ispahbudan in north eastern Iran. In addition to the titles granted by Yazdegerd III, the Dabuyid rulers also bore the old Iranian military title of ispahbadh as their regnal title.

Farrukhan the Great, repelled a great Muslim invasion under Yazid ibn al-Muhallab in 716–717, Recent scholarship places his assumption of power there in the 670s instead of the early 710s, as previously assumed. Farrokhan died in 728, and was succeeded by his son, Dadhburzmihr (Dadmihr). Little is known of his reign, and he died at an early age in 740/741. Dadmihr's son and successor, Khurshid, was still a boy when he was crowned Ispahbadh of Tabaristan, requiring his uncle Farrukhan the Little to rule as regent for seven years until Khurshid came of age. Khurshid ruled a prosperous state and tried repeatedly, though without success, to break his ties to the Caliphate. Following the turmoil of the Abbasid Revolution, a serious conflict ensued between Khurshid and the Abbasid Caliph Al-Mansur. In 759, Mansur used a ruse to launch a campaign against the Dabuyid dynasty. He sought Khurshid's aid in subduing a rebellion in Khorasan by allowing the Caliph's forces to pass through Tabaristan. Khushid permitted this only to be faced with a surprise attack which led to the invasion and subsequent fall of Tabaristan. The fleeing Khurshid took refuge in Gilan, where he attempted to reinforce for a counter attack but following the capture of the royal family committed suicide in 761, thus ending the reign of the Dabuyid dynasty.

Dabuyid rulers 
 Gil Gavbara (640-660)
 Dabuya (660-676)
 Farrukhan the Great (712-728)
 Dadhburzmihr (728-740/41)
 Farrukhan the Little (740/41-747/48) as regent for
 Khurshid (741-759/60)

See also 
 Padusbanids
 Bavand dynasty
 House of Ispahbudhan

References

Sources 
  Inostranzev, M. (1918) Iranian Influence on Moslem Literature – Appendix I: Independent Zoroastrian Princes of Tabaristan.
 
 
 

 
Iranian dynasties
Zoroastrian dynasties
History of Mazandaran Province
Monarchy in Persia and Iran
Tabaristan
7th century in Iran
8th century in Iran
640s establishments
760s disestablishments
History of Talysh